Solheim Church is a parish church of the Church of Norway in Masfjorden Municipality in Vestland county, Norway. It is located in the village of Solheim, along the shore of the Masfjorden. It is the church for the Masfjorden parish which is part of the Nordhordland prosti (deanery) in the Diocese of Bjørgvin. The white, wooden church was built in a long church design in 1882 using plans drawn up by the architect Ole Syslak. The church seats about 200 people and it serves the eastern part of the municipality.

History
The people of eastern Masfjorden had long desired a church of their own due to the long journey to their parish church, Sandnes Church. The new church was designed by Ole Syslak who also led the construction. The parish also credits Jacob Wilhelm Nordan as helping with the design. Nordan was an architect and the church ministry's consultant in construction matters. Presumably Nordan corrected parts of Syslak's drawings. The church was consecrated on 24 March 1882 by the Bishop Waldemar Hvoslef. In 1957, electric lights were installed in the church and then in 1960, electric heating was installed. In 1965, Erlend Tryti designed an addition that was built to the east. The small extensions on each side of the church porch and tower were designed by Ole Halvorsen and built around 1970. The church was refurbished for the 125th anniversary in 2007.

See also
List of churches in Bjørgvin

References

Masfjorden
Churches in Vestland
Wooden churches in Norway
Long churches in Norway
19th-century Church of Norway church buildings
Churches completed in 1882
1882 establishments in Norway